The 2016 World Junior Ice Hockey Championships was the 40th Ice Hockey World Junior Championship. It was hosted in Helsinki, Finland. It began on December 26, 2015, and ended with the gold medal game on January 5, 2016. This marked the sixth time that Finland has hosted the WJC, and the hosts defeated Russia 4–3 in overtime to win their fourth title in history and second in the last three years. Belarus was relegated to Division I-A for 2017 by merit of their tenth-place finish, while Finnish right winger Jesse Puljujärvi earned MVP and top scorer honors.

Player eligibility 
A player is eligible to play in the 2016 World Junior Ice Hockey Championships if:
 the player is of male gender;
 the player was born at the earliest in 1996, and at the latest, in 2001;
 the player is a citizen in the country he represents;
 the player is under the jurisdiction of a national association that is a member of the IIHF.

If a player who has never played in IIHF-organized competition wishes to switch national eligibility, he must have played in competitions for two consecutive years in the new country without playing in another country, as well as show his move to the new country's national association with an international transfer card. In case the player has previously played in IIHF-organized competition but wishes to switch national eligibility, he must have played in competitions for four consecutive years in the new country without playing in another country, he must show his move to the new country's national association with an international transfer card, as well as be a citizen of the new country. A player may only switch national eligibility once.

Top Division

Venues

Officials
The IIHF selected 12 referees and 10 linesmen to officiate during the tournament:

Referees
  Alexei Anisimov
  Andris Ansons
  Stefan Fonselius
  Brett Iverson
  Daniel Konc
  Mikael Nord
  Vladimir Pešina
  Daniel Piechaczek
  Christopher Pitoscia
  Aleksi Rantala
  Jean-Philippe Sylvain
  Marc Wiegand

Linesmen
  Nicolas Chartrand-Piche
  Matjaž Hribar
  Rene Jensen
  Roman Kaderli
  Pasi Nieminen
  Brian Oliver
  Alexander Otmakhov
  Henrik Pihlblad
  Hannu Sormunen
  Alexander Waldejer

Rosters

Format
The four best ranked teams from each group of the preliminary round advance to the quarterfinals, while the last placed team from both groups play a relegation round in a best of three format to determine the relegated team.

Preliminary round 
All times are local. (Eastern European Time – UTC+2)

Group A

Group B

Relegation

Playoff round

Quarterfinals

Semifinals

Bronze medal game

Final

Statistics

Scoring leaders 

GP = Games played; G = Goals; A = Assists; Pts = Points; +/− = Plus-minus; PIM = Penalties In Minutes
Source: IIHF

Goaltending leaders 

(minimum 40% team's total ice time)

Tournament awards
Reference: 
Most Valuable Player
 Forward:  Jesse Puljujärvi

All-star team
 Goaltender:  Linus Söderström
 Defencemen:  Olli Juolevi,  Zach Werenski
 Forwards:  Jesse Puljujärvi,  Patrik Laine,  Auston Matthews

IIHF best player awards
 Goaltender:  Linus Söderström
 Defenceman:  Zach Werenski
 Forward:  Jesse Puljujärvi

Final standings

Note that due to the lack of playoff games for determining the spots 5–8, these spots were determined by the preliminary round records for each team.

Division I

Group A
The Division I A tournament was played in Vienna, Austria, from 13 to 19 December 2015.

Group B
The Division I B tournament was played in Megève, France, from 12 to 18 December 2015.  Prior to the start of the tournament Japan withdrew, and was relegated for 2017.

Division II

Group A
The Division II A tournament was played in Elektrėnai, Lithuania, from 13 to 19 December 2015.

Group B
The Division II B tournament was played in Novi Sad, Serbia, from 17 to 23 January 2016.

Division III

The Division III tournament was played in Mexico City, Mexico, from 15 to 24 January 2016.

References

External links
 
 Official site for the 2016 World Junior Ice Hockey Championships

 
2015 in ice hockey
2016 in ice hockey
2016
2016
2015 in Finnish sport
2016 in Finnish sport
International sports competitions in Helsinki
January 2016 sports events in Europe
December 2015 sports events in Europe
2016 World Junior Ice Hockey Championships